İş Yatırım Menkul Değerler A.Ş. is the investment bank arm of İşbank, the largest privately-owned bank in Turkey. IS Investment had assets totaling 8.8 billion Turkish Lira in 2020.

History and general information

İş Yatırım is described as a leading Investment Bank in Turkey and was established in 1996. Türkiye İş Bankası A.Ş. and its group companies hold 70,8% of the ownership shares in İş Yatırım, the rest is free float. 

Beyond traditional brokerage services, Is Investment focuses on corporate finance, IPO's, investment advisory, asset management and research. It has leading market shares in equity, bond, derivatives and FX trading. 

In 2002, IS Investment organised the IPO of Besiktas Football Club as the first such transaction in the Turkish market. Is Investment went public itself in May 2007.

Subsidiaries 
İş Yatırım includes several subsidiaries with various degrees of participation in them.

See also 
 Investment banking
 Istanbul Stock Exchange (Borsa İstanbul)

References

External links  
 

Banks of Turkey
Banks established in 1996
Financial services companies established in 1996
Companies listed on the Istanbul Stock Exchange
Investment management companies of Turkey
Turkish companies established in 1996